Daniel Sorenson is a fictional detective on the popular TV series, NYPD Blue, appearing from season six (1998) through season eight (2001).  The character was played by actor Rick Schroder.

Biography
Sorenson, a US Army Desert Storm veteran approximately 27 years old, was introduced in episode six of the sixth season as the 15th squad's replacement for the deceased Bobby Simone.  He was partnered with Detective Andy Sipowicz. In childhood, Sorenson immigrated to the United States from Norway along with his younger sisters following the death of his father. They were raised by their aunt in Albany, New York, and he felt a lifelong sense of responsibility for their care. At first other officers tended to regard Sorenson as somewhat inexperienced, and often referenced his youthful appearance, but Sorenson's hard-core professionalism and aggressive tactics soon earned respect. In private, however, Sorenson, a US Army reservist, was shown to be tormented by personal issues stemming from childhood events that centered on family responsibilities. Despite this, he was regarded by his contemporaries among his fellow officers as a source of good advice and stability, and as something of a mentoring type. Sorenson was shown in season seven to be attracted to Detective Diane Russell, widow of detective Bobby Simone, whom Sorenson replaced. The pair became romantically involved for a time.

In 2001, actor Rick Schroder voiced dislike of the presentation of the character of Sorenson, claiming writers had changed him to the point that he, Schroder, had lost both sympathy for him and interest in him, and stated a desire to leave the series at the end of season eight. As a result, Sorenson, who was depicted late in season eight as having mentored a homeless drug addict whose addiction ultimately killed him, was shown to enter a state of personal turmoil, becoming inattentive and apathetically disrespectful while on the job, and spending his off-duty hours drinking and carousing. Exactly to what extent this was in fact part of an act was left unresolved, but it was written into the storyline that Sorenson had taken on an assignment that involved pretending to fall from grace with the NYPD and infiltrating organized crime factions within Manhattan. After being reported as missing, Sorenson's remains were discovered in a shallow grave at the beginning of season nine, with the character's death being attributed to the mob syndicate he had been attempting to infiltrate just before the September 11 attacks.

Fictional New York City Police Department detectives
NYPD Blue characters
Fictional Norwegian people
Fictional immigrants to the United States
Television characters introduced in 1998